The 1944 United States presidential election in Kansas took place on November 7, 1944, as part of the 1944 United States presidential election. Voters chose eight representatives, or electors, to the Electoral College, who voted for president and vice president.

Kansas was won by Governor Thomas E. Dewey (R–New York), running with Governor John Bricker, with 60.25% of the popular vote, against incumbent President Franklin D. Roosevelt (D–New York), running with Senator Harry S. Truman, with 39.18% of the popular vote. Dewey's margin was the biggest against FDR in any state during the four elections he contested, and the 104 counties (all except Wyandotte) that FDR lost is the most he lost in any state during his four elections to the White House.

Results

Results by county

See also
 United States presidential elections in Kansas

References

Kansas
1944
1944 Kansas elections